Robert L. Paarlberg is a professor at Wellesley College and Associate at the Weatherhead Center for International Affairs at Harvard University. He is the author of several books and numerous articles.

His research focuses on the international agricultural and environmental policy, regulation of modern technology, including biotechnology.

Selected works
Resetting the Table: Straight Talk About the Food We Grow and Eat, Knopf
Fixing Farm Trade, Council on Foreign Relation
Food Trade and Foreign Policy, Cornell University Press
Countrysides at Risk, Overseas Development Council
Leadership Abroad Begins at Home, Brookings
Policy Reform in American Agriculture, Chicago University Press (with David Orden and Terry Roe)
The Politics of Precaution, Johns Hopkins
Starved for Science: How Biotechnology Is Being Kept Out of Africa, Harvard University Press (March 2008)
Food Politics: What Everyone Needs to Know
The United States of Excess, Gluttony and the Dark Side of American Exceptionalism, Oxford University Press (April 2015)

Personal life
Robert Paarlberg is the son of academic and public servant Don Paarlberg. He graduated from Carleton College in 1967 with a degree in government.

References

Biography at Wellesley College
Biogram at the Weatherhead Center for International Affairs

Living people
Year of birth missing (living people)